David John Coombs (born February 1937) is a British author, historian, and teacher. He is a former editor of the Antique Collector and was a columnist for the British weekly trade magazine, Antiques Gazette.

Coombs is best known for his research on Winston Churchill's art work, publishing two books on the subject (1967 and 2003). He has been described as "the official authority on Churchill's art." He produced and later revivised a catalogue which brings together all of Churchill's 500 or so paintings and 2 sculptures, in which each piece has been given a number prefixed with the letter C for Coombs. This catalogue also exist in the form of a digital archive of the paintings. His 1967 catalogue was described as "an indispensable catalogue" of Churchill's art.

Bibliography
 Churchill: His Paintings, by David Coombs (1967)
 Sir Winston Churchill's Life Through His Paintings, by David Coombs with Minnie Churchill (2003)
 Sir Winston Churchill: His Life and His Paintings, by Minnie Churchill and David Coombs (2013)

References

1937 births
Living people
British historians